This is a list of Canadian films which were released in 1987:

See also
 1987 in Canada
 1987 in Canadian television

1987
1987 in Canadian cinema
Canada